Kenneth Parker MacLeod Sr. (February 14, 1923 - October 23, 2001) was an American politician from Maine. A Republican, MacLeod served one term (1962-1964) in the Maine House of Representatives and 4 terms (1966-1974) in Maine Senate, including 3 terms as President of the Maine Senate. Growing up in Brewer, Maine, MacLeod represented his district in the Maine Legislature. In 1964, he ran for U.S. Congress as the Republican nominee and lost.

MacLeod graduated from the University of Maine in 1940 and was a decorated fighter pilot in the United States Air Force during World War II.

References

1923 births
2001 deaths
People from Skowhegan, Maine
People from Brewer, Maine
University of Maine alumni
United States Army Air Forces pilots of World War II
Republican Party members of the Maine House of Representatives
Presidents of the Maine Senate
Republican Party Maine state senators
20th-century American politicians